Randy Chadwick Baldwin (born August 19, 1967) is a former American professional football player who played six seasons in the National Football League as a running back and kick returner for the Minnesota Vikings, Cleveland Browns, Carolina Panthers and Baltimore Ravens.

After playing college football for the University of Mississippi, Baldwin was taken in the 4th round of the 1991 NFL Draft by the Minnesota Vikings where he would play four games as a Special teams player and returning one kickoff for 14 yards. The following season, he joined the Cleveland Browns, where he would spend three seasons as both a kick returner and backup running back. While with the Browns, Baldwin scored the only two touchdowns of his career, one receiving touchdown in 1993 and a one on a kick return in 1994. He joined the expansion Carolina Panthers in 1995 and expansion Baltimore Ravens in 1996 before retiring after the 1996 season.

1967 births
Living people
American football running backs
Baltimore Ravens players
Carolina Panthers players
Cleveland Browns players
Holmes Bulldogs football players
Minnesota Vikings players
Ole Miss Rebels football players
People from Griffin, Georgia
Players of American football from Georgia (U.S. state)